Medionidus conradicus is a species of freshwater mussel, an aquatic bivalve mollusk in the family Unionidae, the river mussels.

This species is endemic to the drainages of the Cumberland River and the Tennessee River in the United States.

References

Molluscs of the United States
conradicus
Bivalves described in 1834
Taxonomy articles created by Polbot